A Little History of the World (originally in German) is a history book by Ernst Gombrich. It was written in 1935 in Vienna, Austria, when Gombrich was 26 years old. He was rewriting it for English readers when he died in 2001, at 92, in London. Gombrich insisted that only he translate the book into English. After his death, the translation was completed, according to his wishes, by Caroline Mustill, an assistant to Gombrich from 1995 until his death, and his granddaughter Leonie Gombrich. It was published in 2005 by Yale University Press.

Short history 
The short history chronicles human development from the inventions of cavemen to the results of the First World War. Additionally, the book describes the beliefs of many major world religions, including Judaism, Hinduism, Buddhism, Christianity, and Islam, and incorporates these ideas into its narrative presentation of historical people and events.

Leonie Gombrich explains in the introduction to the English-language edition that Gombrich, writing the last phases of his doctoral thesis, had corresponded with the young daughter of some friends, who wanted to know what he was spending all of his time on at work.  It was a great pleasure for Gombrich to explain his doctoral work to the girl, using only words and concepts that children could understand.  Convinced that an intelligent child could understand even seemingly complicated ideas in history, if they were put into intelligible terms, Gombrich composed a sample chapter on the "" (Time of the Knights), and sent it to the publisher Walter Neurath.  Excited about the text, but somewhat pressed for time, Neurath asked Gombrich to produce a complete script in six weeks, so that the book could be printed.  Unsure of his ability to satisfy such a demand, Gombrich, after some convincing, promised to try.  He set himself to the task of writing a chapter a day (with the exception of Sundays, when he would read his work to Ilse Heller, later his wife). He spent his mornings and afternoons reading in his home and at the library and reserved his evenings for composition.  He chose his themes based on what seemed to him to be the most influential events in history from a modern perspective, and based upon what remains best remembered.  Somewhat miraculously, he delivered the text on time, and the book appeared to the public in 1936.

Later, the book was banned during the National Socialist (Nazi) regime for being too pacifistic.

Gombrich's goal in the book is summarized in his following words, which appear in the foreword to the book's Turkish edition:

"I would like to emphasize that this book isn't thought of and wasn't ever thought of as a replacement for history books used in schools, which serve an entirely different purpose.  I would like for my readers to relax and to follow history without having to take notes of names and dates.  I promise too, that I won't ask you for them."

Reviews

Anthony Grafton, in The Wall Street Journal, reviewed Gombrich's book:  "Lucky children will have this book read to them.  Intelligent adults will read it for themselves and regain contact with the spirit of European humanism at its best."

Chapter titles 
 Once Upon a Time
 The Greatest Inventors of All Time
 The Land by the Nile
 Sunday, Monday
 The One and Only God
 I C-A-N R-E-A-D
 Heroes and Their Weapons
 An Unequal Struggle
 Two Small Cities in One Small Land
 The Enlightened One and His Land
 A Great Teacher of a Great People 
 The Greatest Adventure of All
 New Wars and New Warriors
 An Enemy of History
 Rulers of the Western World
 The Good News
 Life in the Empire and at its Frontiers
 The Storm
 The Starry Night Begins
 There is No God but Allah, and Muhammad is His Prophet
 A Conqueror who Knows how to Rule
 A Struggle to Become Lord of Christendom
 Chivalrous Knights
 Emperors in the Age of Chivalry
 Cities and Citizens
 A New Age
 A New World
 A New Faith
 The Church at War
 Terrible Times
 An Unlucky King and a Lucky King
 Meanwhile, Looking Eastwards...
 A Truly New Age 
 A Very Violent Revolution
 The Last Conqueror
 Men and Machines
 Across the Seas
 Two New States in Europe
 Dividing Up the World
 The Small Part of the History of the World Which I Have Lived Through Myself: Looking Back

Editions 
Gombrich, Ernst H.  Eine Kurze Weltgeschichte für junge Leser.  Dumont.  Germany, 2005.
Gombrich, Ernst H.  A Little History of the World. Yale.  UK and USA, 2005. 
 with Clifford Harper (illustrator). Paperback, 2008.

References 

1935 non-fiction books
History books
German non-fiction books
World history